Ian McCrae (born 19 May 1941) is a former Scotland international rugby union player. He played at Scrum half.

Rugby Union career

Amateur career

He played for Gordonians. He played for the club for 4 different decades from 1959 to the 1980s.

Provincial career

He played for North of Scotland District and North and Midlands.

International career

He played for Scotland 6 times between 1967 and 1972.

He was the first permitted substitute in international rugby union.

References

1941 births
Living people
Scottish rugby union players
Scotland international rugby union players
Gordonians RFC players
North and Midlands players
North of Scotland (standalone) players
Rugby union scrum-halves